The 1991 International cricket season was from May 1991 to September 1991.

Season overview

May

West Indies in England

August

Sri Lanka in England

References

1991 in cricket